The Cameron Files may refer to:

 The Cameron Files: Secret at Loch Ness, a video game
 The Cameron Files: Pharaoh's Curse, a video game sequel